This article lists the heads of state of the United States of Indonesia, a short-lived federal state which existed from 17 December 1949 to 17 August 1950. The heads of state held different titles depending upon their constituent state. Each constituent state had the same head of state throughout the short existence of the federation. 

This list does not include autonomous and unrecognized regions.

Bibliography

References

Notes 

Government of Indonesia
Lists of political office-holders in Indonesia